The World Federation of Agricultural Workers (FMTA) was a global union federation bringing together unions representing workers in agriculture industries.

The federation was established on 27 April 1921 at a meeting in The Hague.  Initially named the International Federation of Christian Agricultural Workers' Unions, the federation affiliated to the International Federation of Christian Trade Unions.

By 1979, the federation's affiliates claimed a total of 3,397,000 members.  In 1982, it merged with the World Federation of Workers in Food, Drink, Tobacco and Hotel Industries, to form the World Federation of Agriculture and Food Workers.

References

Agriculture and forestry trade unions
Global union federations
World Confederation of Labour
Trade unions established in 1921
Trade unions disestablished in 1982